Anoumaba is a town in south-central Ivory Coast. It is a sub-prefecture and commune of M'Batto Department in Moronou Region, Lacs District. The border with Lagunes District is 10 kilometres south of the town.

In 2014, the population of the sub-prefecture of Anoumaba was 19,463.

Villages
The 13 villages of the sub-prefecture of Anoumaba and their population in 2014 are:

References

Sub-prefectures of Moronou Region
Communes of Moronou Region